Allen, also known as Allen City, is a home rule-class city in Floyd County, Kentucky, in the United States. The population was 193 at the 2010 census, up from 150 at the 2000 census.

History
Allen was first settled in the early 19th century. The first post office was named "Mouth of Beaver" and was established on August 21, 1854 (Thomas P. Johns, postmaster). The town began to develop rapidly  after the establishment of a Chesapeake and Ohio Railroad station. The station was interchangeably known as "Beaver Creek" and "Beaver Creek Junction". In 1905, another post office opened and was named "Allen" after local resident T.J. Allen. The town was formally incorporated by the state assembly in 1913. In 1936, the railroad station was renamed to prevent confusion during mail delivery. An area outside the city limits known as "New Allen" began to develop in 1937 after a bridge was constructed across the Levisa Fork River.

On June 30, 2022, a mass shooting targeting police officers occurred in Allen. Three police officers and a police dog were killed, and four other people were injured, including three officers. The alleged shooter, 49-year-old Lance Storz, was arrested and charged with murder and attempted murder of a police officer.

Geography
Allen is located north of the center of Floyd County at  (37.613421, -82.725826). It sits at the confluence of Beaver Creek with the Levisa Fork, a north-flowing tributary of the Big Sandy River and part of the Ohio River watershed.

U.S. Routes 460 and 23 pass just north of Allen, leading northwest  to Prestonsburg, the county seat, and southeast  to Pikeville.

Demographics

As of the census of 2010, there were 193 people, 67 households residing in the city. There were 67 housing units. The racial makeup of the city was 99.48% White, 0.00% African American, 0.00% Hispanic or Latino, 0.00% Asian or Pacific Islander, 0.00% Native American and 0.52% from two or more races.

In the city, the population was spread out, with 22.8% under the age of 18, 63.73% from 18 to 64, and 13.47% who were 65 years of age or older. The median age was 35.4 years.

The median income for a household in the city was $45,104, and the median income for a family was $26,875. The per capita income for the city was $13,247. There were 19.7% of the population living below the poverty line.

Education
Wesley Christian School
Allen Elementary
Prestonsburg High School
Big Sandy Community & Technical College

Recreation
John M. Stumbo Park
Paul Hunt Thompson Golf Course

References

External links

Cities in Kentucky
Cities in Floyd County, Kentucky
Populated places established in 1913
1913 establishments in Kentucky